The Federal Office of Police (Fedpol) of Switzerland is subject to the Federal Department of Justice and Police. It is responsible for the coordination between cantonal police corps and between Swiss and foreign police forces. It also controls the Swiss internal intelligence agency, Dienst für Analyse und Prävention (DAP; Analysis and Prevention Service) and investigates organised crime, money laundering and terrorism.

Fedpol publishes a yearly report on domestic security. Its investigative arm is the Federal Criminal Police, which operates a small special operations unit—Task Force TIGRIS—whose existence was not made public until 2009.

Organisation

 Directorate and Staff
 International Police Cooperation Bureau (INTERPOL Bureau)
 Federal Criminal Police
 Swiss Coordination Unit for Cybercrime Control (CYCO)
 Task Force TIGRIS 
 Services
 AFIS/DNA Services Division
 Identity Documents and Special Tasks Division 
 ICT Management and Services Division 
 National Police Information Systems Division 
  Federal Security Service
 Security of Persons Division ― Dignitary Protection and Security of Foreign Missions and Foreign Visitor Protection and Aviation Security.
 Building Security Division - Property Security Section, Property Protection Section and Management Support Division.
 Resources Group

See also
 Law enforcement in Switzerland
 Swiss Border Guard

External links 
 
 Yearly reports (1999–present)

Federal Department of Justice and Police
Federal offices of Switzerland
Federal law enforcement agencies of Switzerland
National Central Bureaus of Interpol